This is a list of schools in the Metropolitan Borough of Doncaster in the English county of South Yorkshire.

State funded schools

Primary schools

Adwick Primary School, Woodlands
Arksey Primary School, Arksey
Armthorpe Shaw Wood Academy, Armthorpe
Askern Littlemoor Infant Academy, Askern
Askern Moss Road Infant Academy, Askern
Atlas Academy, Doncaster Town Centre
Auckley School, Auckley
Balby Central Primary Academy, Balby
Barnburgh Primary School, Barnburgh
Barnby Dun Primary Academy, Barnby Dun
Bawtry Mayflower Primary School, Bawtry
Bentley High Street Primary School, Bentley
Bentley New Village Primary School, Bentley
Bessacarr Primary, Bessacarr
Branton St Wilfrid's CE Primary School, Branton
Brooke Primary Academy, Thorne
Canon Popham CE Primary Academy, Edenthorpe
Carcroft Primary School, Carcroft
Carr Lodge Academy, Balby
Castle Academy, Conisbrough
Conisbrough Ivanhoe Primary Academy, Conisbrough
Copley Junior School, Sprotbrough
Crookesbroom Primary Academy, Hatfield
Denaby Main Primary Academy, Denaby Main
Dunsville Primary School, Dunsville
Edenthorpe Hall Primary Academy, Edenthorpe
Edlington Victoria Academy, Edlington
Grange Lane Infant Academy, Rossington
Green Top School, Thorne
Hatchell Wood Primary Academy, Bessacarr
Hatfield Woodhouse Primary School, Hatfield Woodhouse
Hawthorn Primary School, Cantley
Hayfield Lane Primary School, Auckley
Hexthorpe Primary School, Hexthorpe
Highfields Primary School, Highfields
Highwoods Academy, Mexborough
Hill Top Academy, Edlington
Holy Family RC Primary School, Stainforth
Hooton Pagnell All Saints CE Primary School, Hooton Pagnell
Intake Primary Academy, Intake
King Edward Primary School, Thorne
Kingfisher Primary Academy, Wheatley
Kirk Sandall Infant School, Kirk Sandall
Kirk Sandall Junior School, Kirk Sandall
Kirkby Avenue Primary School, Bentley
Lakeside Primary Academy, Doncaster Town Centre
Long Toft Primary School, Stainforth
Mallard Primary School, Balby
Marshland Primary Academy, Moorends
Mexborough St John the Baptist CE Primary School, Mexborough
Montagu Academy, Mexborough
Morley Place Academy, Conisbrough
New Pastures Primary School, Mexborough
Norton Infant School, Norton
Norton Junior School, Norton
Our Lady Of Mount Carmel RC Primary School, Intake
Our Lady Of Perpetual Help RC Primary School, Bentley
Our Lady of Sorrows RC Voluntary Academy, Armthorpe
Outwood Primary Academy Woodlands, Woodlands
Owston Park Primary Academy, Skellow
Park Primary School, Wheatley
Pheasant Bank Academy, Rossington
Plover Primary School, Intake
Richmond Hill Primary Academy, Sprotbrough
Rosedale Primary School, Scawsby
Rossington All Saints Academy, Rossington
Rossington St Michaels CE Primary School, Rossington
Rossington Tornedale Infant School, Rossington
Rowena Academy, Conisbrough
St Alban's RC Primary School, Denaby Main
St Francis Xavier RC Primary School, Balby
St Joseph and St Teresa's RC Primary School, Woodlands
St Joseph's RC School, Rossington
St Mary's RC Primary School, Edlington
St Oswald's CE Academy, Finningley
St Peter's RC Primary School, Belle Vue
Saltersgate Infant School, Scawsby
Saltersgate Junior School, Scawsby
Sandringham Primary School, Intake
Scawthorpe Castle Hills Primary Academy, Scawthorpe
Scawthorpe Sunnyfields Primary School, Scawthorpe
Sheep Dip Lane Academy, Dunscroft
Southfield Primary, Armthorpe
Spa Academy Askern, Askern
Sprotbrough Orchard Infant School, Sprotbrough
Stainforth Kirton Lane Primary School, Stainforth
Tickhill Estfeld Primary School, Tickhill
Tickhill St Mary's CE Primary School, Tickhill
Toll Bar Primary School, Toll Bar
Town Field Primary School, Doncaster Town Centre
Tranmoor Primary, Armthorpe
Travis St Lawrence CE Primary School, Hatfield
Wadworth Primary School, Wadworth
Warmsworth Primary School, Warmsworth
Waverley Academy, Balby
West Road Primary Academy, Moorends
Willow Primary School, Bessacarr
Windhill Primary School, Mexborough
Woodfield Primary School, Balby

Secondary schools

The Armthorpe Academy, Armthorpe
Ash Hill Academy, Hatfield
Astrea Academy Woodfields, Balby
Campsmount Academy, Norton
De Warenne Academy, Conisbrough
Don Valley Academy, Scawthorpe
Doncaster UTC, Doncaster Town Centre
Hall Cross Academy, Doncaster Town Centre
The Hayfield School, Auckley
Hungerhill School, Edenthorpe
The Laurel Academy, Mexborough
The McAuley Catholic High School, Cantley
Outwood Academy Adwick, Woodlands
Outwood Academy Danum, Intake
Ridgewood School, Scawsby
Rossington All Saints Academy, Rossington
Sir Thomas Wharton Academy, Edlington
Trinity Academy, Thorne
XP East, Belle Vue
XP School, Belle Vue

Special and alternative schools

Bader Academy, Edenthorpe
Coppice School, Hatfield
Heatherwood School, Wheatley Hills
The Levett School, Sprotborough
Maple Medical PRU, Balby
North Ridge Community School, Adwick le Street
Pennine View School, Conisbrough
St Wilfrid's Academy, Bessacarr
Stone Hill School, Scawsby

Further education
Doncaster College
Doncaster Collegiate Sixth Form
New College Doncaster

Independent schools

Primary and preparatory schools
Sycamore Hall Preparatory School, Balby

Senior and all-through schools
Hill House School, Auckley

Special and alternative schools
Doncaster School for the Deaf, Doncaster Town Centre
Field Gate School, Fishlake
Fullerton House School, Denaby
More Than Ed Independent Special School, Balby
North Bridge Enterprise College, Doncaster Town Centre

Doncaster
Schools in Doncaster
Schools